Acalolepta itzingeri is a species of beetle in the family Cerambycidae. It was described by Stephan von Breuning in 1935.

Subspecies
 Acalolepta itzingeri itzingeri (Breuning, 1935)
 Acalolepta itzingeri rosselli Breuning, 1970
 Acalolepta itzingeri trobriandensis Breuning, 1970
 Acalolepta itzingeri woodlarkiella Breuning, 1970

References

Acalolepta
Beetles described in 1935